Wild Bank is a hill in Stalybridge, just outside the Peak District National Park. Its western flank rises from the valley of the River Tame to a height of 399 metres. To the east of the summit, the ground falls away more gradually to Shaw Moor and Hollingworthhall Moor, beyond which are Mottram in Longdendale and Hollingworth. Since 2004, the moorland in the area of the pike has been classed as access land. From the summit the centre of Manchester, Winter Hill and the Cheshire Plain can be seen. On very clear days the mountains of Snowdonia are visible.

Mountains and hills of the Peak District
Mountains and hills of Greater Manchester
Geography of Tameside